The following is a list of E instruments, or instruments for which the concert pitch of E is notated as C in standard terminology. They are listed by the type of instrument, such as woodwind and brass.

Woodwind instruments 

 Sopranino Saxophone
 Alto saxophone
 Baritone saxophone
 Contrabass saxophone
 Soprano flute
 E♭ clarinet
 Alto Clarinet
 Contra-alto Clarinet
 Octocontra-alto clarinet

Brass instruments 
 E cornet, also known as a soprano cornet
 Tenor horn, known as an Alto Horn in the US
 Tuba in E-flat (written at concert pitch when using the bass clef, only transposing when written in treble clef)
 Circular altohorn (Koenig horn) pitched in E
 Tenor cornet
 Mellophone
 Alto trombone
 Vocal horn (cornet with an upward-facing bell)
 Duplex horn (Gemelli) pitched in E
 Tenor horn (with a forward-facing bell)
 Tenor ventil horn pitched in E (an early horn that was one of the first to use valves)
 Over the shoulder bass horn pitched in E
 Solo Horn, an Alto Horn wrapped like a Cornet with forward facing bell
Cornets are occasionally known as coronets, although this may be a historical corruption of the word 'cornet'.

<div style="margin-top:1.7%;">

Percussion and stringed instruments 
 Clavichord pitched in E
 Mōsō biwa pitched in E

See also 
E-flat major
E

External links 
A list of historical E instruments

E-flat instruments, list of